Heidi Greni (born 3 July 1962) is a Norwegian politician for the Centre Party.

She served as a deputy representative to the Parliament of Norway from Sør-Trøndelag during the term 2009–2013. In March 2011, when regular representative Ola Borten Moe joined the cabinet, Greni became a full representative. She joined the Standing Committee on Local Government and Public Administration.

She hails from Ålen, and in the 2011 Norwegian local elections she was elected as mayor of Holtålen as the first non-Labour mayor in 104 years.

References

1962 births
Living people
Members of the Storting
Centre Party (Norway) politicians
Mayors of places in Sør-Trøndelag
Women members of the Storting
21st-century Norwegian politicians
21st-century Norwegian women politicians
Women mayors of places in Norway